Thomas Edward "Tom" Warburton (born July 23, 1968), better known as Mr. Warburton, is an American animator, producer, writer, and character designer. He is best known for creating the animated television series Codename: Kids Next Door. He also created the animated short Kenny and the Chimp. Prior to that, he served as production designer on the first season of Beavis and Butt-Head and was the lead character designer for the animated series Pepper Ann. He is also the author of the book A Thousand Times No. Since moving to Los Angeles in 2009, he has worked at Disney Television Animation serving as creative director on Fish Hooks, co-executive producer on The 7D and executive producer on Muppet Babies.

Early life
Warburton was born in Philadelphia, the son of Charles Warburton Jr. and Vesna (née Krajacic), and grew up in Ambler. He attended Kutztown University, where he studied graphic design.

Work

Buzzco Associates
After graduating from Kutztown University, Mr. Warburton moved to New York City to work at Buzzco Associates. The studio, run by NYC animation veterans Vincent Cafarelli and Candy Kugel, primarily took on commercial work to help fund their own independent films like the award-winning short A Warm Reception in LA. Warburton learned the basics of animation production from the ground up and got to meet many people in the industry that he remains friends with today.

Nickelodeon's Doug
After working at Buzzco Associates, Warburton went to Jumbo Pictures to work as an assistant layout artist on the first season of Nickelodeon's new series Doug. The show premiered alongside Rugrats and The Ren & Stimpy Show, which ushered in a new creator-driven approach to cartoon-making. Warburton also provided assistant animation to the end credit sequence for the show.

J.J. Sedelmaier Productions
Originally signing on as JJSP's first staff artist in 1992, Warburton spent five years working as an animator on dozens of commercials for clients like Levi's, Converse, Slim Jim and 7 Up. He also animated, designed, and directed on Saturday Night Lives TV Funhouse, directed new episodes of Schoolhouse Rock! (including the award-winning "The Tale of Mr. Morton"), and served as production designer on the first season of MTV's groundbreaking and controversial series Beavis and Butt-Head. While working on 7 Up commercials at the studio, Mr. Warburton met Fido Dido creator Sue Rose and the two found that their similar art styles might work well together in the future.

Pepper Ann
While at JJSP, Warburton did freelance work helping Sue Rose design characters for a series about a quirky and imaginative girl named Pepper Ann. The show was initially in development at Nickelodeon, but was later picked up to series by Disney Television Animation. Even though the production was based in Los Angeles, Warburton remained in NYC, working as lead character designer and faxing his drawings at night. The series ran for five seasons on Disney's One Saturday Morning block. Eventually, Warburton left JJSP to work solely on Pepper Ann and to develop his own projects.

Work at Cartoon Network

Kenny and the Chimp and Codename: Kids Next Door
Kenny and the Chimp was an unproduced animated series planned by Warburton. It was about an unlucky boy named Kenny who was constantly accompanied by an unintelligent chimpanzee named Chimpy, who would regularly create trouble for him in the various situations they experienced. Produced by Hanna-Barbera, the episode "Diseasy Does It" was the only one made. Its alternative title was "Chimp-N-Pox". Warburton also provided the voice for the chef in that short. There is also another episode called "Got Your Nose", and it was about to also be produced, but never released. After realizing that Cartoon Network was not going to make Kenny and the Chimp into a series, Warburton began developing the recurring characters, the Kids Next Door, a group of children who would often get Kenny into trouble, into a series. Instead of just being five troublemakers, the five kids became a "multi-ethnic team of experts battling against evil adult super villains bent on raising the drinking age of soda up to 13 and making Summer school year round". Cartoon Network commissioned a pilot so Warburton temporarily moved to Los Angeles to make the short at the newly opened Cartoon Network Studios in Burbank. The story involved the KND's plot to stop the local swimming pool's seemingly endless adult swim guarded over by lifeguards Mr. Wink and Mr. Fibb (characters loosely based on Mr. Wint and Mr. Kidd from the 1971 James Bond movie Diamonds Are Forever). In addition, the character Professor XXXL, who was featured in "Diseasy Does It", became a recurring character in Kids Next Door. Kenny and the Chimp make a brief cameo in the pilot episode of Codename: Kids Next Door, "No P in the Ool".

Sheep in the Big City
Mo Willems was starting the second season of his Cartoon Network series Sheep in the Big City and asked Warburton to come aboard as a director at NYC-based Curious Pictures. The two found they worked well together, each feeding off each other's similar and differing talents. Sheeps second season proved to be its last and the series was canceled. This coincided with Codename: Kids Next Door winning Cartoon Network's 2001 Big Pick Weekend and being greenlit to series.

1000 Times No
After finishing Kids Next Door, Warburton pitched his first children's book to Laura Geringer Books, an imprint of HarperCollins. 1000 Times No was released on April 28, 2009 to positive reviews. An animated version was made for Nickelodeon's Nick Jr. channel at Curious Pictures.

Work at Disney Channel

Fish Hooks
In 2010, Warburton moved with his wife and two children to Los Angeles. Shortly afterwards, he was hired as creative director on the Disney Channel series Fish Hooks, created by Noah Z. Jones and executive produced by fellow Cartoon Network alum Maxwell Atoms. Three seasons were produced before coming to an end.

The 7D
After Fish Hooks, a good portion of the staff rolled on to the Disney XD series The 7D, a comedic take on the Seven Dwarfs from Disney's first feature film Snow White and the Seven Dwarfs. With character designs by Noah Z. Jones and executive-produced by Tom Ruegger (Tiny Toon Adventures, The Plucky Duck Show, Animaniacs, Freakazoid!, Pinky and the Brain and Pinky, Elmyra & the Brain), Warburton was initially brought on as creative director but was soon promoted to co-executive producer. The show received strong ratings upon its premiere, but the show was canceled after its second season.

Muppet Babies
While finishing post-production on The 7D, Warburton was tapped to develop and executive produce a CG reboot of the 1980s hit animated show Muppet Babies. The series aired on Disney Junior from March 23, 2018, to February 18, 2022.

References

External links
 Warburton Labs (official blog)
 

1968 births
Living people
American animated film producers
American television producers
American television writers
American male television writers
American storyboard artists
American voice directors
Animators from Pennsylvania
Cartoon Network Studios people
Hanna-Barbera people